Užvarčiai ('place beyond the gates', formerly ) is a village in Kėdainiai district municipality, in Kaunas County, in central Lithuania. According to the 2011 census, the village had a population of 19 people. The Pašušvys-Pernarava road goes through the village. The Lapkalnys-Paliepiai Forest is located next to Užvarčiai.

Demography

References

Villages in Kaunas County
Kėdainiai District Municipality